Kentucky Route 245 (KY 245) is a  state highway in Kentucky that runs from U.S. Route 150 in southeastern to Bardstown to Kentucky Route 61 south of Shepherdsville.

Route description

The highway begins at US 150 on the east-southeast side of Bardstown, just west of US 150's junction with the Bluegrass Parkway. It then serves as a northern bypass of Bardstown, intersecting US 62 and US 150 again, this time in an overlap with US 31E. From there, it travels primarily northwestward, passing along the northern side of the Bernheim Arboretum and Research Forest. It then intersects with I-65 at exit 112 south of Shepherdsville before ending at KY 61.

Points of interest
 Thomas Nelson High School
 Rooster Run general store
 Bernheim Forest

History 
The highway was established as an unimproved JY 332 when the state's highway system began. It was redesignated as KY 245 at some point between 1940 and 1957.

Major intersections

References

External links
KY 245 at KentuckyRoads.com

Transportation in Bullitt County, Kentucky
Transportation in Nelson County, Kentucky
0245
Bardstown, Kentucky